Lathyrus  is a genus of flowering plants
in the legume family Fabaceae, and contains approximately 160 species. Commonly known as peavines or vetchlings, they are native to temperate areas, with a breakdown of 52 species in Europe, 30 species in North America, 78 in Asia, 24 in tropical East Africa, and 24 in temperate South America. There are annual and perennial species which may be climbing or bushy.  This genus has numerous sections, including Orobus, which was once a separate genus.

Uses
Many species are cultivated as garden plants. The genus includes the garden sweet pea (Lathyrus odoratus) and the perennial everlasting pea (Lathyrus latifolius). Flowers on these cultivated species may be rose, red, maroon, pink, white, yellow, purple or blue, and some are bicolored. They are also grown for their fragrance. Cultivated species are susceptible to fungal infections including downy and powdery mildew.

Other species are grown for food, including the Indian pea (L. sativus) and the red pea (L. cicera), and less commonly cyprus-vetch (L. ochrus) and Spanish vetchling (L. clymenum). The tuberous pea (L. tuberosus) is grown as a root vegetable for its starchy edible tuber. The seeds of some Lathyrus species contain the toxic amino acid oxalyldiaminopropionic acid and if eaten in large quantities can cause lathyrism, a serious disease.

Diversity

Species include:

Lathyrus alpestris
Lathyrus angulatus – angled pea
Lathyrus annuus – red fodder pea
Lathyrus aphaca – yellow pea
Lathyrus aureus – golden pea
Lathyrus basalticus
Lathyrus bauhinii
Lathyrus belinensis
Lathyrus biflorus – twoflower pea
Lathyrus bijugatus – drypark pea
Lathyrus blepharicarpus – ciliate vetchling
Lathyrus boissieri
Lathyrus brachycalyx – Bonneville pea
Lathyrus cassius
Lathyrus chloranthus
Lathyrus cicera – red pea
Lathyrus ciliolatus
Lathyrus cirrhosus
Lathyrus clymenum – Spanish vetchling
Lathyrus crassipes – arvejilla
Lathyrus cyaneus
Lathyrus davidii
Lathyrus decaphyllus – prairie vetchling
Lathyrus delnorticus – Del Norte pea
Lathyrus digitatus
Lathyrus eucosmus – seemly vetchling, bush vetchling
Lathyrus filiformis
Lathyrus gloeospermus
Lathyrus gorgoni
Lathyrus graminifolius – grassleaf pea
Lathyrus grandiflorus – twoflower everlasting pea
Lathyrus grimesii – Grimes' pea
Lathyrus heterophyllus – Norfolk everlasting pea
Lathyrus hirsutus – hairy vetchling
Lathyrus hitchcockianus – Bullfrog Mountain pea
Lathyrus holochlorus – thinleaf pea
Lathyrus hygrophilus
Lathyrus inconspicuus
Lathyrus incurvus
Lathyrus japonicus – sea pea, beach pea
Lathyrus jepsonii – delta tule pea
Lathyrus laetivirens – aspen pea
Lathyrus laevigatus
Lathyrus lanszwertii – Nevada pea
Lathyrus latifolius – everlasting pea, perennial pea
Lathyrus laxiflorus
Lathyrus libani – Lebanon vetchling
Lathyrus linifolius – bitter vetch, heath pea
Lathyrus littoralis – silky beach pea
Lathyrus macropus
Lathyrus magellanicus
Lathyrus nervosus – Lord Anson's blue pea
Lathyrus nevadensis – Sierra pea
Lathyrus niger – black pea
Lathyrus nissolia – grass vetchling
Lathyrus nudicaulis 
Lathyrus ochroleucus – cream pea
Lathyrus ochrus – Cyprus-vetch
Lathyrus odoratus – sweet pea
Lathyrus palustris – marsh pea
Lathyrus pannonicus
Lathyrus pauciflorus – fewflower pea
Lathyrus pisiformis
Lathyrus polyphyllus – leafy pea
Lathyrus pratensis – meadow vetchling
Lathyrus pseudocicera
Lathyrus pubescens
Lathyrus pusillus – tiny pea, singletary vetchling
Lathyrus quinquenervius
Lathyrus rigidus – stiff pea
Lathyrus roseus
Lathyrus sativus – Indian pea, white pea, chickling vetch
Lathyrus sphaericus – grass pea
Lathyrus splendens – pride of California
Lathyrus sulphureus – snub pea
Lathyrus sylvestris – flat pea
Lathyrus szowitsii
Lathyrus tingitanus – Tangier pea
Lathyrus torreyi – Torrey's peavine
Lathyrus tuberosus – tuberous pea
Lathyrus undulatus – wavy pea
Lathyrus vaniotii – Korean mountain vetchling
Lathyrus venetus
Lathyrus venosus – veiny pea, bushy vetchling
Lathyrus vernus – spring pea
Lathyrus vestitus – Pacific pea
Lathyrus vinealis
Lathyrus whitei

Ecology
Lathyrus species are used as food plants by the larvae of some Lepidoptera species, including the grey chi (Antitype chi) and the latticed heath (Chiasmia clathrata), both recorded on meadow vetchling (Lathyrus pratensis), and Chionodes braunella. Lathyrus growth abundance and size both decrease in response to increased temperatures in montane meadows.

Notes

External links
 
  Calflora Database: Lathyrus species index
 Jepson Flora Project: Key to Lathyrus

 
Fabaceae genera
Garden plants
Taxa named by Carl Linnaeus